Mortality is the state of being mortal, or susceptible to death; the opposite of immortality.

Mortality may also refer to:

 Fish mortality, a parameter used in fisheries population dynamics to account for the loss of fish in a fish stock through death
 Mortality (book), a 2012 collection of essays by Anglo-American writer Christopher Hitchens
 Mortality (computability theory), a property of a Turing machine if it halts when run on any starting configuration
 Mortality rate, a measure for the rate at which deaths occur in a given population
 Mortality/differential attrition, an error in the internal validity of a scientific study

See also
 Case fatality rate, the proportion of deaths within a designated population of people with a medical condition
 Cause of death
 Fulminant
 Mortality displacement, a (forward) temporal shift in the rate of mortality
 Mortality rate or death rate
 Mortality salience, awareness of one's eventual death
 Mortal (disambiguation)
 Morbidity and mortality (disambiguation)